Anne Marie Pohtamo (born 15 August 1955) is a Finnish actress, model and beauty queen who was the second woman from Finland to capture the Miss Universe crown. She claimed the Miss Universe crown in 1975 at the pageant held in El Salvador. 

Pohtamo was crowned by Miss Universe 1972 Kerry Anne Wells, not by her predecessor Amparo Muñoz, as Muñoz resigned after six months reign, when she refused a trip to Japan.

From the very beginning, she was a big favorite during the pageant. After the reigning year as Miss Universe, Pohtamo worked as a fashion model at Wilhelmina Model Agency in New York for 5 years. However, in the midst of her rising career, she returned to Finland in 1981 and worked in fashion and beauty business for decades. She became a devout Christian in 1992 and has been a Protestant evangelist and lecturer ever since.

Pohtamo is partly of Russian descent.

References

External links
 

1955 births
Actresses from Helsinki
Finnish beauty pageant winners
Finnish people of Russian descent
Living people
Miss Finland winners
Miss Universe 1975 contestants
Miss Universe winners